BET France is a French TV channel owned to Paramount Global, it is the French version of BET in the United States. It was launched on November 17, 2015 in France.

In October 2015, the launch of BET France was announced for November 17, 2015. This information created a controversy because of the absence of black animators on a historical community channel.

After weeks of negotiations, an agreement was reached between the ViacomCBS and Canal groups, the Canal Group retains the BET channels, MTV Hits France and J-One.
 
The channel's voiceover is China Moses.

Since January 14, 2020, the channel has changed its number and is now on channel 85 of the Canal+

In 2021, Canal+ replaced BET in its overseas operations by Nickelodeon Junior.

References

External links

2015 establishments in France
BET Networks
Television stations in France
Television channels and stations established in 2015